PGG may refer to:
 Pentagalloyl glucose
 PGG-glucan, a type of beta-glucan
 Public goods game, a standard of experimental economics

pgg may refer to :
 Group pgg, a wallpaper group
 Pangwali language ISO 639-3 code